Kvant-2 (English: Quantum-II/2) (77KSD, TsM-D, 11F77D) was the third module and second major addition to the Mir space station. Its primary purpose was to deliver new science experiments, better life support systems, and an airlock to Mir. It was launched on November 26, 1989 on a Proton rocket. It docked to Mir on December 6. Its control system was designed by the NPO "Electropribor" (Kharkiv, Ukraine).

Description

Kvant-2 was the first Mir module based on the TKS spacecraft (77k module). Kvant-2 was divided into three compartments. They were the EVA airlock, the instrument/cargo compartment, and the instrument/experiment compartment. The instrument/cargo compartment could be sealed off and act as an extension or a back-up to the airlock. Before Kvant-2 docked to the station, EVAs had to be carried by depressurizing the docking node on the Core Module. Kvant-2 also carried the Soviet version of the Manned Maneuvering Unit for the Orlan space suit. It delivered the Salyut 5B computer which was an improvement over the Argon 16B computer already on the station. Kvant-2 had a system for regenerating water from urine and a shower for personal hygiene. It carried six gyrodynes to augment those already located in Kvant-1. Unlike Kvant-1, Kvant-2's gyrodynes were only accessible from the exterior which made replacement of failed ones more difficult.

Scientific equipment on Kvant-2 included a high-resolution camera, spectrometers, X-ray sensors, the Volna 2 fluid flow experiment, and the Inkubator-2 unit which was used for hatching and raising quail. A list of experiments and equipment follows:
ARIZ X-ray spectrometer
ASPG-M scan platform carrying ITS-7D IR spectrometer (using the Czech sensor platform first used on Vega spacecraft).
Cosmic dust detectors
Gamma 2 spectrometer package
Ikar EVA unit
Inkubator 2 - bird egg incubator
KAP-350 topographic camera
MKF-6MA Earth resources film camera - 6 spectral bands. Provided by East Germany.
MKS-M2 optical spectrometer
Phaza AFM-2 spectrometer
Spektr-256 spectrometer
Sprut 5 charged particle spectrometer (installed 1991).
TV cameras
Volna 2 propellant tank demonstration (250 kg)

Gallery

References

External links

Russian Space Web
Encyclopedia Astronautica
Gunter's Space Page - information on Kvant-2

Mir
Spacecraft launched in 1989